Marcio dos Santos Silva (born February 5, 1969) is a former Brazilian football player.

Playing career
Mineiro joined Japanese J1 League club Kyoto Purple Sanga in September 1997. On September 6, he debuted as midfielder against Vissel Kobe. He played all 7 matches without one match for suspension and left the club end of 1997 season.

Club statistics

References

External links

kyotosangadc

1969 births
Living people
Brazilian footballers
Brazilian expatriate footballers
Expatriate footballers in Japan
J1 League players
Kyoto Sanga FC players
Association football midfielders